The End of the Red Line is an abstract light sculpture by Alejandro and Moira Sina. 

It is located at Alewife (MBTA station), in Cambridge, Massachusetts. The intensity of the light is varied gradually over time.

See also
Arts on the Line

References

External links

Arts on the Line
Cambridge, Massachusetts
1985 works
Neon lighting